El Leoncito may refer to:

 Leoncito Astronomical Complex, an Argentinian observatory 
 El Leoncito National Park, an Argentinian national park
 2311 El Leoncito, an asteroid